Jeanne Gervais, née Jeanne Ahou Siefer-N’Dri (June 6, 1922 – December 9, 2012) was an Ivorian politician and the first woman minister in Côte d'Ivoire.

Born in Grand-Bassam, Gervais was the daughter of a French father and a Baoulé mother. A longtime member of the Democratic Party of Côte d'Ivoire – African Democratic Rally, she participated in the women's march in her hometown in 1949. Trained as a teacher at the École normal de Rufisque, she became one of three women, alongside Hortense Aka-Anghui and Gladys Anoma, elected to the National Assembly immediately after independence. She served in that body from 1965 until 1980. In 1976, she was named head of the Ministry of Women's Affairs, remaining in that role until 1984 and becoming the first woman to serve in the Ivorian cabinet. She was also active for many years as president of the 
Association des Femmes Ivoiriennes.

References

1922 births
2012 deaths
Democratic Party of Côte d'Ivoire – African Democratic Rally politicians
Members of the National Assembly (Ivory Coast)
Women's ministers
Government ministers of Ivory Coast
Women government ministers of Ivory Coast
20th-century Ivorian women politicians
20th-century Ivorian politicians
20th-century Ivorian educators
People from Grand-Bassam
Baoulé people
Ivorian people of French descent